Sir Mark Philip Elder  (born 2 June 1947) is a British conductor. He is currently music director of the Hallé Orchestra in Manchester, England.

Life and career
Elder was born in Hexham, Northumberland, the son of a dentist. He played the bassoon when in primary school, and at Bryanston School, Dorset, where he was one of the foremost musicians (bassoon and keyboards) of his generation.  He attended Corpus Christi College, Cambridge as a choral scholar, where he studied music. He later became a protégé of Sir Edward Downes and gained experience conducting Verdi operas (as well as Prokofiev's War and Peace and Wagner's Meistersinger) in Australia, at the Sydney Opera House.

Family
Elder and his wife, Mandy, have a daughter, Katie.

The ENO and association with several orchestras
From 1979 to 1993, Elder was the music director of English National Opera (ENO).  He was known as part of the "Power House" team that also included general director Peter Jonas and artistic director David Pountney, and gave ENO several very successful years of productions.

Elder served as principal guest conductor of the City of Birmingham Symphony Orchestra (1992–1995) and music director of the Rochester Philharmonic Orchestra (1989–1994). He held positions as Principal Guest Conductor of the BBC Symphony Orchestra (1982–1985) and the London Mozart Players (1980–1983).

The Hallé years
Elder was appointed music director of the Hallé Orchestra in 1999. His first concert as music director was in October 2000.  He proposed several novel ideas for concerts.  These have included the abandonment of traditional concert evening garb. 

Elder is generally regarded as having restored the orchestra to high musical standards, after a period where the continuing existence of the orchestra was in doubt. In 2004, he signed a contract to extend his tenure from 2005 to 2008, with an optional two-year extension at the end of that time. A 2005 report indicated Elder's intention to remain with the orchestra until at least 2010.

In May 2009, the orchestra announced the extension of Elder's contract to 2015. In November 2013, the Hallé announced the further extension of Elder's contract through "at least 2020".  In February 2023, Elder stated his intention to stand down as music director of The Hallé at the close of the 2023-2024 season.

Elder has been president of the London Philharmonic Choir from 2014 and is currently the Royal Academy of Music's Barbirolli Chair of Conducting.  In November 2021, the Bergen Philharmonic Orchestra announced the appointment of Elder as its next principal guest conductor, effective from 1 August 2022, with an initial contract of three years through 31 July 2025.

Public pronouncements
Elder first conducted the Last Night of the Proms in 1987. He was scheduled to conduct again in 1990, but his remarks about the nature of some of the traditional Proms selections in the context of the impending first Gulf War led to his dismissal from that engagement. 

In 2006, he returned to conduct the BBC Symphony Orchestra for his second "Last Night" engagement, and used the traditional speech at the end of the concert to criticise aircraft baggage restrictions, in place following the uncovering of the 2006 transatlantic aircraft plot, which have made it difficult for musicians to carry their instruments on aircraft. In a reference to the fact that laptop computers are now allowed in aircraft cabins, Elder said, "...it seems to me that next year we should all look forward to 'Concerto for Laptop and Orchestra'." He made a plea for children to be given more opportunity to sing at school.

Honours
Elder was appointed Commander of the Order of the British Empire (CBE) in the 1989 Queen's Birthday Honours. He won an Olivier Award in 1991 for his outstanding work at English National Opera.  He received the 2006 conductor prize of the Royal Philharmonic Society. In April 2007, Elder was one of eight conductors of British orchestras to endorse the 10-year classical music outreach manifesto, "Building on Excellence: Orchestras for the 21st Century", to increase the presence of classical music in the UK, including giving free entry to all British schoolchildren to a classical music concert. 

Elder was knighted in the Queen's Birthday Honours of June 2008. He was appointed Member of the Order of the Companions of Honour (CH) in the 2017 Birthday Honours for services to music.

Orchestra of the Age of Enlightenment
In addition to being involved in the above-named orchestras, Elder became "principal artist" of the 
Orchestra of the Age of Enlightenment in December 2011. As noted in the article: "His first project with the OAE as principal artist was [to give] a performance of Berlioz's Romeo and Juliet on 18 February 2012 at the Royal Festival Hall, London."

Style
Describing his own conducting style, Elder has said that in contrast to Sir Adrian Boult, who was 
famously non-perspirational:
I'm quite a physical conductor. I remember seeing Adrian Boult backstage after the 1978 Proms and he was wearing a freshly ironed light blue M&S shirt and he said to me "I see you're one of the sweaty ones."

Recordings and writing
Elder has recorded for the Hyperion, NMC, Chandos, Opera Rara, and Glyndebourne record labels, as well as for the Hallé Orchestra's own label. In addition to his conducting and recording activities, Elder also has written on music for The Guardian and other newspapers.

References

External links
Mark Elder biography at the Bridgewater Hall
Interview with Mark Elder at MusicalCriticism.com, 13 June 2008
Femke Colborne, MusoLife article on Mark Elder, 1 August 2007.

Two Interviews with Mark Elder by Bruce Duffie, 20 October 1986 & 10 October 1997

1947 births
Living people
People from Hexham
English conductors (music)
British male conductors (music)
Music directors (opera)
People educated at Bryanston School
Knights Bachelor
Conductors (music) awarded knighthoods
Commanders of the Order of the British Empire
Alumni of Corpus Christi College, Cambridge
Fellows of Corpus Christi College, Cambridge
Honorary Members of the Royal Academy of Music
20th-century British conductors (music)
20th-century English musicians
21st-century British conductors (music)
21st-century English musicians
Members of the Order of the Companions of Honour
20th-century British male musicians
21st-century British male musicians